Haysi Fantayzee were a short lived British pop band of the early 1980s. Their best known songs are "John Wayne Is Big Leggy", released in 1982 and "Shiny Shiny", released in 1983.

Career
Haysi Fantayzee was an avant-garde, new wave pop project emanating from the Blitz Kids street arts scene in London in the early 1980s. The group's music combined reggae, country and electro with political and sociological lyrics couched as nursery rhymes.

Catapulted to stardom by their visual sensibilities, Haysi Fantayzee combined their extreme clothes sense – described as combining white Rasta, tribal chieftain and Dickensian styles – with a quirky musical sound comparable to, but distinct from, other new wave musical pop acts of the era, such as Bow Wow Wow, Adam and the Ants and Bananarama. They appeared several times on the BBC Television programme Top of the Pops.

The band was formed in 1981 and consisted of Jeremy Healy (also known as "Jeremiah"), Kate Garner, and Garner's boyfriend songwriter/producer/manager Paul Caplin. They released four singles in 1982 and 1983: "John Wayne is Big Leggy", "Holy Joe", "Shiny Shiny", and "Sister Friction". They followed up with an album, Battle Hymns for Children Singing.  

Before they were signed, the band attracted attention by sending video performances with their demo tapes to record companies, a highly unusual practice at the time. Their outfits were often designed by Garner, and the two singers looked like distorted mirror images of each other, with similar hair and make-up. 

In a 1983 interview with David Maples on the Los Angeles-based TV show MV3, Jeremy Healy accused the singer known as Boy George (George O'Dowd) of imitating his unusual look. Boy George later responded: "When Jeremy saw my locks he was livid. Both he and Kim [Bowen] stopped speaking to me. They thought I had stolen their look. It wasn't their look to steal..."

Garner also appeared alongside Bananarama in the music video for "Who's That Girl" by Eurythmics. She had a brief solo career after the break-up of Haysi Fantayzee, and then pursued a career in photography in Los Angeles, California.

Healy released the single "When Malindy Sings" in 1984, and later became a DJ and album mixer for other artists, including his former schoolfriend, Boy George. He recorded on George's More Protein record label under the name E-Zee Possee.

Caplin went on to a career as an entrepreneur. He founded several technology firms, most recently Caplin Systems Ltd, which he sold in 2014. He now makes music with his wife Zeeteah Massiah.

Discography

Albums

Singles

See also
List of performers on Top of the Pops
List of new wave artists and bands

References

External links
 Haysi Recollections – unofficial site
 

English pop music groups
English new wave musical groups
Musical groups established in 1981